Jonáš Forejtek and Jiří Lehečka were the defending champions, but were no longer eligible to participate in junior tournaments.

Edas Butvilas and Alejandro Manzanera Pertusa won the title, defeating Daniel Rincón and Abedallah Shelbayh in the final, 6–3, 6–4.

Seeds

Draw

Finals

Top half

Bottom half

References

External links 
 Draw

Boys' Doubles
Wimbledon Championship by year – Boys' doubles